Biwabik can refer to a location in the United States:

 Biwabik, Minnesota, a city
 Biwabik Township, St. Louis County, Minnesota